Kothagudem Airport is a proposed greenfield airport at Kothagudem in Bhadradri Kothagudem District of Telangana, India. The Government of Telangana has identified 1,600 acres of land at Punukuduchelka village in Kothagudem mandal for the purpose.

The steering committee on greenfield airports has given site clearance for the proposed aerodrome, which will be the second greenfield airport in the state after Hyderabad Airport.

History 
In 2008, the government of Andhra Pradesh invited for expressions of interest to develop eight minor airports in the state, including an airport at Kurnool. Each airport was expected to cost . However, AAI has rejected this proposal citing insufficient land available for the construction of the airport.

References

Airports in Telangana
Proposed airports in Telangana